Böyük Söyüdlü (also, Bëyuk Sëyudlyu, Beyuk-Segutly, and Beyuk-Sogyutlyu) is a village and municipality in the Oghuz Rayon of Azerbaijan.  It has a population of 1,198.

References 

Populated places in Oghuz District